Nothing Comes for Free is an EP released by the Christian rock band Pillar. It features 3 new songs (including a different mix of "Everything") and 4 live tracks recorded at Blue Cats in Knoxville, Tennessee. The other 2 new songs, "Our Escape" and "Dangerous" are not available on The Reckoning. The EP was only available at live shows and at their webstore.  A limited number of 10,000 copies were created.

Track listing
 "Everything (EP Mix)"  – 3:12
 "Our Escape" (previously unreleased)  – 3:39
 "Dangerous" (previously unreleased)  – 3:20
 "Fireproof" (Live @ Blue Cats)  – 4:50
 "Simply" (Live @ Blue Cats)  – 4:34
 "Everything" (Live @ Blue Cats)  – 3:20
 "Frontline" (Live @ Blue Cats)  – 5:13

References

2006 EPs
Pillar (band) albums